State Highway 1 (West Bengal) is a state highway in West Bengal, India.

Route
SH 1 originates from Bangaon and passes through Chakdaha, Madanpur, Kalyani, Halisahar, Naihati, Ichapore, Barrackpore, Kolkata, Jadavpur, Garia, Rajpur Sonarpur, Baruipur, Jaynagar and terminates at Kulpi.

The total length of SH 1 is 151 km.

Districts traversed by SH 1 are:
North 24 Parganas district (0 - 32 km)Nadia district (32-91 km)South 24 Parganas (91-151 km)

Road sections
It is divided into different sections as follows:

See also
List of state highways in West Bengal

References

State Highways in West Bengal
Transport in Jaynagar Majilpur